Craugastor polyptychus is a species of frog in the family Craugastoridae.
It is found in Costa Rica, Nicaragua, and Panama.
Its natural habitats are subtropical or tropical moist lowland forests, plantations, rural gardens, and heavily degraded former forest.
It is threatened by habitat loss.

References

polyptychus
Amphibians described in 1885
Taxonomy articles created by Polbot